Enoch Mushagalusa (born November 13, 1999) is a Congolese professional footballer who plays for Louisville City in the USL Championship.

Career

College and amateur
After playing with the Colorado Rapids academy from the under-15's, Mushagalusa went on to play one year of college soccer at Salt Lake Community College in 2018, where he scored 27 goals in 17 appearances. He had previously committed to play at Fort Lewis College.

In 2017 and 2018, Mushagalusa played in the USL PDL with Colorado Rapids U23 and tallied a total of 53 goals in 85 U.S. Soccer Development Academy appearances with the Rapids Academy.

Professional
Mushagalusa was set to continue playing college soccer at the University of South Carolina in 2020, but instead opted to opted to sign a professional contract with USL Championship side Sporting Kansas City II on February 26, 2020. He made his professional debut on March 8, 2020, appearing as a 60th-minute substitute in a 1–2 loss to Charlotte Independence.

On 18 January 2022, Mushagalusa signed with Louisville City. On 12 July 2022, Mushagalusa was named USL Championship Player of the Week for Week 18 of the 2022 season, after scoring his first career hat trick in a 6-0 victory over New York Red Bulls II.

References

External links
 SLCC profile
 

1999 births
Living people
Democratic Republic of the Congo footballers
Democratic Republic of the Congo expatriate footballers
Footballers from Kinshasa
Soccer players from Colorado
Association football forwards
Sporting Kansas City II players
Louisville City FC players
USL Championship players
USL League Two players
Salt Lake Bruins men's soccer players
21st-century Democratic Republic of the Congo people